Jákup is a Faroese masculine given name, a cognate of the names Jacob and James. People with the name Jákup include:
Jákup á Borg (born 1979), Faroese footballer
Jákup Dahl (1878-1944), Faroese Provost and Bible translator  
Jákup Pauli Gregoriussen (born 1932), Faroese architect
Jákup Jakobsen, (1864-1918), Faroese linguist and literary scholar 
Jákup Jógvansson (16??-16??), Prime Minister of the Faroe Islands from 1677 to 1679
Jákup Mikkelsen (born 1970), Faroese footballer 

Faroese masculine given names